Oinas is an Estonian and Finnish surname meaning "ram" or "wether" (Ovis aries). 

Notable people bearing the surname Oinas include:

Aleksander Oinas (1887–1942), Estonian politician
Alma Ostra-Oinas (1886–1960), Estonian journalist, writer and politician
Asko Oinas (1929–2020), Finnish government official and Governor of Lapland 
August Oinas (1898–1965), Estonian historian
Felix Oinas (1911–2004), Estonian folklorist, linguist, scholar and translator
Toivo Oinas (born 1954), Finnish singer 
Valdar Oinas (born 1942), Estonian astrophysicist

References

Estonian-language surnames
Finnish-language surnames